Piano in the Foreground is an album by American pianist, composer and bandleader Duke Ellington recorded and released on the Columbia label in 1961. It features Ellington in a piano trio setting, emphasising his own keyboard prowess rather than the big band arrangements more typical of his recordings.

Track listing
:All compositions by Duke Ellington except as indicated
 "I Can't Get Started" (Vernon Duke, Ira Gershwin) – 4:23  
 "Cong-Go" (Aaron Bell, Ellington) – 4:16  
 "Body and Soul" (Edward Heyman, Robert Sour, Frank Eyton, Johnny Green) – 4:49  
 "Blues for Jerry" – 4:38  
 "Fontainebleau Forest" – 2:53  
 "Summertime" (George Gershwin, Ira Gershwin, Dubose Heyward) – 3:52  
 "It's Bad to Be Forgotten" – 3:22  
 "A Hundred Dreams Ago" – 2:26  
 "So" – 4:33  
 "Searching (Pleading for Love)" – 1:49  
 "Springtime in Africa" (Bell, Ellington) – 3:46  
 "Lotus Blossom" (Billy Strayhorn) – 3:18  
 "All the Things You Are" (Oscar Hammerstein II, Jerome Kern) – 4:00 Bonus track on CD reissue   
 "All the Things You Are" [alternate take] (Hammerstein, Kern) – 3:51 Bonus track on CD reissue   
 "Piano Improvisation No. 2" – 3:25 Bonus track on CD reissue   
 "Piano Improvisation No. 3" – 2:48 Bonus track on CD reissue  
 "Piano Improvisation No. 4" – 1:53 Bonus track on CD reissue   
 "Piano Improvisation No. 1" – 9:45 Bonus track on CD reissue  
Recorded:
at Columbia Records 30th Street Studio on March 20, 1957 (tracks 15–18) (stereo)
at Columbia Records 30th Street Studio on October 10, 1957 (tracks 13–14) (monaural)
at Radio Recorders, Los Angeles on March 1, 1961 (tracks 1–11) & March 2, 1961 (track 12) (stereo)

Personnel
Duke Ellington – piano 
Aaron Bell – bass (#1–12)
Jimmy Woode – bass (#13–18)
Sam Woodyard – drums

References

Columbia Records albums
Duke Ellington albums
1961 albums